The Evans VP-2 is a development of the Evans VP-1 Volksplane, both of which were designed in La Jolla, California by aeronautical engineer William Samuel "Bud" Evans. Evans had formerly worked at Convair, Ryan Aircraft and General Dynamics.

Design and development
Work on the design of the VP-1, was completed between 1966 and 1968, the intention being that the design would be simple to build for a novice working at home.  The design was successful, and, following a first flight in September 1968, a large number of aircraft have been constructed by homebuilders.  The aircraft are usually powered by converted Volkswagen air-cooled engines.

The VP-1 is a single-seat open-cockpit low-wing monoplane manufactured from spruce and plywood with fabric covered wings.

Following the success of the VP-1 a two-seat variant, the VP-2 was designed to meet normal category limits, which are 3.8 positive and 1.9 negative g. The first VP-2 (then known as VP II) flew in 1971.

The VP-2 is externally similar in appearance to the VP-1 but with a  wider fuselage and enlarged cockpit section to accommodate two side-by-side configuration seats. The aircraft is  longer and has a  addition to wingspan. The VP-2 can use any Volkswagen air-cooled engine model from 1,834 to 2,100 cc. Other similar powerplants can be substituted.

Operational history
Although numerous examples of the VP-2 were constructed from plans provided by the Evans Aircraft Company, the VP-2 is no longer being offered with the company having stopped marketing the VP-2 and responding to technical inquiries. The main concern from the company was that the VP-2 may have liability issues associated with two-seat aircraft. VP-2 plans and modified VP-2 plans remain available on the Internet, although the Evans Aircraft Company neither authorizes nor approves of these plans.

Preserved examples
 City of Norwich Aviation Museum, Norfolk, England

Specifications (60 hp engine)

References

Notes

Bibliography

 "Plane and Pilot." 1978 Aircraft Directory. Santa Monica California: Werner & Werner Corp.,.1977. .
 Purdy, Don: AeroCrafter – Homebuilt Aircraft Sourcebook, Fifth Edition. Chatswood, New South Wales, Australia: BAI Communications, 1998. .
 Taylor, John W. R. Jane's All The World's Aircraft 1982–83. London: Jane's Yearbooks, 1982. .

External links
 "Evans VP-1 Volksplane history."

1960s United States sport aircraft
Low-wing aircraft
Single-engined tractor aircraft
VP-02
Aircraft first flown in 1971